The 1975 Tour de France was the 62nd edition of the Tour de France, one of cycling's Grand Tours. Eddy Merckx was attempting to win his sixth Tour de France, but became a victim of violence. Many French spectators were upset that a Belgian might beat the record of five wins set by France's Jacques Anquetil. During stage 14 a spectator leapt from the crowd and punched Merckx in the kidney. Frenchman Bernard Thévenet took over the lead. After Merckx subsequently fell and broke his cheekbone, he was unable to challenge Thévenet, who went on to win the Tour with Merckx second.

Belgian cyclists were successful in the secondary classifications: the points classification was won by Rik Van Linden, mountains classification by Lucien Van Impe, and the intermediate sprints classification by Marc Demeyer. For the first time, there was young rider classification, won by Italian Francesco Moser.

Teams

There were 14 teams participating, with 10 cyclists each.

The teams entering the race were:

Pre-race favourites

Eddy Merckx, who had won all five times that he participated, was again the big favourite. Merckx' first part of the season had been going well, winning Milan–San Remo, the Tour of Flanders and Liège–Bastogne–Liège.
If Merckx would win again, he would beat Jacques Anquetil and become the first cyclist to win the Tour six times. Merckx did not care about that record: "The idea doesn't interest me very much because then people would want me to go for a seventh and then an eighth".

A few months before the race, Merckx was unsure if he would start the Tour. His race schedule had been very busy, and he thought riding the Giro and the Tour in the same year would not work. Merckx preferred to ride the Tour, but his Italian team preferred the Giro.

Bernard Thévenet contracted shingles during the 1975 Vuelta a España, but recovered and won the Dauphiné Liberé.

Route and stages

The 1975 Tour de France started on 26 June, and had two rest days, the first in Auch the second after the finish on the Puy de Dôme, during which the cyclists were transferred to Nice. The 1975 Tour de France did not include a team time trial for the first time since 1962. After 1975, it would be included again every year until 1995. The final stage had become more popular over the years, and the Tour organisers therefore moved the finish line from the Vélodrome de Vincennes to the more prestigious Champs-Élysées.

Race overview

Francesco Moser won the prologue, and kept the lead until the first time trial. Merckx started the Tour aggressively, which caused the peloton to split in two groups in the first stage. Eddy Merckx and Moser were in the first group, and won a minute on most of their competitors. In the second part of the first stage, the field split again, but this time Thevenet and Poulidor were also in the first group.
In stage six, a time trial, Merckx beat Moser and became the leader.

The first climbing was done in the tenth stage, but the favourites stayed together, and the general classification was not changed.
The major Pyrenéan mountains were scheduled in stage eleven. In that stage, Bernard Thévenet and Joop Zoetemelk escaped together, while Merckx could not follow them. Zoetemelk won, with Merckx almost one minute behind. From this point on only Thevenet, Lucien Van Impe, Zoetemelk and Merckx had a realistic chance of winning the maillot jaune as the other favourites finished much later, and lost their hopes of winning the Tour. The fourteenth stage had its finish on top of the Puy de Dôme. When Merckx was about to catch Joop Zoetemelk, a French spectator punched Merckx in the stomach. Zoetemelk did not capitalize and gain time on Merckx because of this as they crossed the finish line with the same time 0:49 behind stage winner Van Impe, who did win some time over the rest of the field together with Thevenet who came in a few seconds behind Van Impe.

After the rest day, the fifteenth stage would end in Pra-Loup. Merckx was still the leader, and escaped from the rest. But on the final climb, Merckx was out of energy, and Thévenet was able to reach Merckx two kilometers from the finish, leave Merckx behind, and win with a margin of two minutes. During that stage, the team car of Bianchi fell 150 meters down, but the driver survived. Thévenet was the new leader, and improved his margin in the sixteenth stage by winning with more than two minutes on Merckx.

While riding to the start of the seventeenth stage, Merckx collided with Ole Ritter, and broke a cheekbone. Merckx' broken cheekbone gave him problems with eating, and the Tour doctor gave him the advice to abandon the race. Merckx decided to stay in the race, because of the prize money for his teammates that his second place in the general classification and other classifications would earn them.

Doping
After every stage in the 1975 Tour de France, the leader of the race, the winner of the stage and the runner-up, and two random cyclists were checked. In total, 110 tests were done, of which three returned positive, Régis Delépine (after stage 5), Felice Gimondi and José-Luis Viejo (both after stage 15). All three were fined with 1000 Swiss Francs, received one month suspended sentence, were set back to the last place in the stage where they tested positive, and received 10 minutes penalty time in the general classification. This meant that Gimondi, who initially finished the Tour in fifth place, was set back to the sixth place.

Classification leadership and minor prizes

There were several classifications in the 1975 Tour de France, four of them awarding jerseys to their leaders. The most important was the general classification, calculated by adding each cyclist's finishing times on each stage. The cyclist with the least accumulated time was the race leader, identified by the yellow jersey; the winner of this classification is considered the winner of the Tour. Time bonuses for stage winners were removed for the 1975 Tour.

Additionally, there was a points classification, where cyclists got points for finishing among the best in a stage finish, or in intermediate sprints. The cyclist with the most points lead the classification, and was identified with a green jersey.

There was also a mountains classification. The organisation had categorised some climbs as either first, second, third, or fourth-category; points for this classification were won by the first cyclists that reached the top of these climbs first, with more points available for the higher-categorised climbs. The cyclist with the most points lead the classification. 1975 was the first year that the leader of the classification wore a white jersey with red polka dots.

The combination classification was removed, and the young rider classification was added. This was decided the same way as the general classification, but only neo-professionals were eligible, and the leader wore a white jersey.

The fifth individual classification was the intermediate sprints classification. This classification had similar rules as the points classification, but only points were awarded on intermediate sprints. In 1975, this classification had no associated jersey.

For the team classification, the times of the best three cyclists per team on each stage were added; the leading team was the team with the lowest total time. The riders in the team that led this classification were identified by yellow caps. There was also a team points classification. Cyclists received points according to their finishing position on each stage, with the first rider receiving one point. The first three finishers of each team had their points combined, and the team with the fewest points led the classification. The riders of the team leading this classification wore green caps.

In addition, there was a combativity award, in which a jury composed of journalists gave points after certain stages to the cyclist they considered most combative. The split stages each had a combined winner. At the conclusion of the Tour, Eddy Merckx won the overall super-combativity award, also decided by journalists. The Souvenir Henri Desgrange was given in honour of Tour founder Henri Desgrange to the first rider to pass the summit of the Col du Télégraphe on stage 17. This prize was won by Luis Balagué.

Final standings

General classification

Points classification

Mountains classification

Young rider classification

Intermediate sprints classification

Team classification

Team points classification

Aftermath
Later, Merckx said that his decision to stay in the Tour after he broke his cheekbone was stupid. He felt that it cut his career short. He said that, instead of worrying about sharing his prize money with his teammates, he should have just paid them out of his own pockets.

Thevenet later confessed that he had used cortisones in 1975.

References

Bibliography

External links

 
Tour
Tour
Tour de France by year
Tour de France
Tour de France
1975 Super Prestige Pernod